Clivina physopleura is a species of ground beetle in the subfamily Scaritinae. It was described by Burgeon in 1935.

References

physopleura
Beetles described in 1935